6H or 6-H can refer to:

IATA code for Israir Airlines
Curtiss JN-6H
JN-6H Jenny; see Curtiss JN-4
Isuzu 6H Engine
6H-SiC, one of the Polymorphs of silicon carbide
Hydrogen-6 (6H), an isotope of hydrogen
6H, the production code for the 1983 Doctor Who serial Enlightenment

See also
H6 (disambiguation)